Jack Mandelbaum (born April 10, 1937 Janek or Jack) is a Holocaust survivor from the Free City of Danzig. His experiences as a boy during World War II were the subject of Andrea Warren's children's book of Mandelbaum surviving in a concentration camp separated from his family: Surviving Hitler: A Boy in the Nazi Death Camps. Mandelbaum was in many different concentration camps; he considered Gross-Rosen to be the worst of them.

Critical reception of the book
Awards for Surviving Hitler: A Boy in the Nazi Death Camps included the 2004 William Allen White Children's Book Award for grades six to eight, the American Library Association's Robert F. Sibert Honor Book for Most Distinguished Informational Book for Children; and Outstanding Children's Book from the American Society of Journalists and Authors

References

External links
 Midwest Center for Holocaust Education website
 Andrea Warren website
 Midwest Center for Holocaust Education website: Jack Mandelbaum
 2015 NPR interview of Mandelbaum

1927 births
Living people
Jewish concentration camp survivors
American people of Polish-Jewish descent
People from Leawood, Kansas
People from the Free City of Danzig